Marco Amadio (born 3 June 1999) is an Italian professional footballer who plays as a midfielder for  club Virtus Verona.

Club career
Formed on Cremonese youth sector, Amadio was loaned to Como in January 2019, and made his senior debut on Serie D.

For the next season, he joined Campodarsego.

On 1 September 2020, he signed with Serie C club Virtus Verona. Amadio made his professional debut on 27 September 2020 against Cesena.

References

External links
 
 

1999 births
Living people
People from Motta di Livenza
Footballers from Veneto
Italian footballers
Association football midfielders
Serie C players
Serie D players
U.S. Cremonese players
Como 1907 players
A.C.D. Campodarsego players
Virtus Verona players
Sportspeople from the Province of Treviso